PageCloud is a software as a service, cloud-based web development platform and drag and drop website builder. The platform allows individuals and businesses to create and maintain websites. PageCloud was founded by Chief executive officer Craig Fitzpatrick and is headquartered in Ottawa, Canada.

In 2015, PageCloud was a finalist in the TechCrunch Disrupt Startup Battlefield.

History
PageCloud was founded in 2014 and officially launched in May 2015 by Craig Fitzpatrick at TechCrunch Disrupt. For seed funding he relied on investments from other software entrepreneurs, including Shopify CEO Tobias Lütke. Fitzpatrick created the initial software after the sale of previous startup Source Metrics, where he became frustrated with how difficult it was to build and run a website.

Finances
During its pre-sale period, the company surpassed $1 million in pre-orders, selling 10,000 licenses before the platform was made publicly available. In November 2016, PageCloud closed a $4 million Series A round, after initially projecting it would do a $10 million Series A.

Product
PageCloud is designed for companies who need websites with less than 30 pages. It provides customizable templates and a drag and drop HTML website builder that includes apps, graphics, image galleries, fonts, and more.

Leadership 

 Mike Grouchy - Chief Executive Officer
 Mark Murray - Chief Financial Officer  
 Mark Stephenson - Chief of Design

References

External links
Official Website
 Leadership

Software companies of Canada
Computer companies of Canada
Web development software
Canadian companies established in 2015
2015 establishments in Ontario
Software companies established in 2015